NSSL may refer to:

 National Security Space Launch, US government procurement contract regime for orbital space launches
 National Severe Storms Laboratory, one of seven regional laboratories of the US National Oceanic and Atmospheric Administration